The Chief Directorate of the Northern Sea Route, also known as Glavsevmorput or GUSMP, was a Soviet government organization in charge of the maritime Northern Sea Route, established in January 1932 and dissolved in 1964.

History

The organization traces its roots to AO Komseverput or KSMP, a shipping company established by the Kolchak government in 1919 and subsequently nationalized by the Bolsheviks. In May 1931 AO Komseverput was reorganized into VO Glavkomseverput; the organization employed 35,000 men scattered all over Arctic, as well as a sizable staff in Moscow and in other mainland cities. A new office, Glavsevmorput, was established in December 1932 and absorbed VO Glavkomseverput in May 1933. Overall management was assigned to the Arctic explorer Otto Schmidt, who had previously managed the Arctic Institute (VAI, later AANII). Glavsevmorput had its own Polar Air service Aviaarktika, headed by Mark Shevelev.
 
Glavsevmorput, in addition to running Arctic shipping, also became the Soviet agency for exploiting resources across the far north and coordinating supplies and transport. It aimed to contribute to the development of northern coastal Siberia; the office was empowered to establish seaports, conduct extensive research, and trade with the United States and Japan as was necessary to its principal function. The organization's quick unchecked expansion, especially in its Moscow offices, was initially masked by the successes of the 1934–1936 seasons.

However, the season of 1937, through a combination of unrealistic plans, bad weather and bad luck, proved a disaster. Twenty-five of 64 ships dispatched on the route (many of them not fit for Arctic conditions) were trapped with crews and cargoes in the Arctic winter; one, Rabochiy, sank. The débâcle, which coincided with the Great Purge of 1936–1938, led to a string of arrests; at least 673 Glavsevmorput personnel were arrested in a domino-effect NKVD operation. The oversized organization was streamlined and stripped of auxiliary functions that were delegated to Dalstroy (land facilities) and to the State trading company  (foreign trade). Glavsevmorput was to concentrate exclusively on maintaining the Northern Sea Route, specifically running its coastal shipping line.

Otto Schmidt, previously a high-profile public figure, was spared but demoted to scientific duties; overall management of the organization was reassigned to Ivan Papanin, a famous polar explorer. Papanin's first season, 1939, was a relatively safe and successful one; the Northern SeaRoute had become a functioning regular line, rather than a dangerous experiment.

In 1953 the organization, previously enjoying the status of a national ministry, was downgraded to a department of the Merchant Fleet ministry. The system continued working and reached peak capacity in 1987.

A large island at the mouth of the Kolyma River (Mikhalkino) was named Glavsevmorput (or GUSMP) Island in honour of the organization .

See also
Great Northern Expedition

Notes

References
 Barr, W. The Drift of Lenin's Convoy in the Laptev Sea, 1937 - 1938. Arctic, v.33 no.1 (March 1980) p. 4-20 
 Barr, W. The First Soviet Convoy to the Mouth of the Lena. Arctic, v.35 no.2 (June 1982) p. 317-325 
 On Russian explorations: 
 75 years of Northern Sea Route (75 лет Северному морскому пути. Пресс-релиз. ААНИИ, 21.02.2008. Arctic and Antarctic Institute)
 Biography of G.A. Ushakov  at Polar World.
 The Northern Sea Route at SHIP & OCEAN FOUNDATION
 The discovery and history of exploration of the Northern Sea Route at The Russian State Museum of Arctic and Antarctic
 John McCannon, Red Arctic, 1932–1939,  
 Red Arctic. Reviewed by Eva-Maria Stolberg. In Search of a Soviet Klondike in the Tundra. 

Exploration of the Arctic
Navigation
Sea lanes
Polar exploration by Russia and the Soviet Union
Political repression in the Soviet Union
Shipping companies of the Soviet Union
Government of the Arctic
Transport in the Arctic